Federico Ravaglia (born 11 November 1999) is an Italian professional footballer who plays as a goalkeeper for  club Bologna.

Club career

Bologna
He was raised in the Bologna youth teams and started playing for their Under-19 squad in the 2016–17 season.

During the 2016–17 and 2017–18 seasons, he appeared on the bench in Serie A matches 40 times, but did not see any playing time.

During the 2020–21 season he became the Bologna's second keeper (after Łukasz Skorupski) during the season, and he also did his debut for the club in Serie A on 13 December 2020 in a 1–5 home loss against Roma.

Loan to Südtirol
On 10 July 2018 he joined Serie C club Südtirol on a season-long loan.

He made his professional Serie C debut for Südtirol on 5 May 2019 in a game against Monza. He replaced Michele Nardi at half-time. That remained his only appearance for Südtirol as he stayed on the bench for the rest of the season.

Loan to Gubbio
On 23 July 2019 he was loaned to Serie C club Gubbio.

He made his first starting-lineup Serie C appearance for Gubbio on 25 August 2019 in a game against Triestina.

Loan to Frosinone 
On 17 July 2021 he was loaned to Serie B side Frosinone.

Loan to Reggina 
On 21 July 2022, Ravaglia joined Reggina on loan. The loan was terminated early in January 2023 after Nicola Bagnolini suffered a long-term injury and Bologna needed a third goalkeeper.

References

External links

 

1999 births
Footballers from Bologna
Living people
Italian footballers
Association football goalkeepers
Bologna F.C. 1909 players
F.C. Südtirol players
A.S. Gubbio 1910 players
Frosinone Calcio players
Reggina 1914 players
Serie A players
Serie B players
Serie C players